The Cycling Union of the Argentine Republic is the national governing body of cycle racing in Argentina.

It is a member of the UCI and COPACI.

References

Argentina
Union
Sports governing bodies in Argentina